The 2017 Thindown Challenger Biella was a professional tennis tournament played on outdoor red clay courts. It was part of the 2017 ATP Challenger Tour. It took place in Biella, Italy between 31 July – 6 August 2017.

Singles main-draw entrants

Seeds

 Rankings are as of July 24, 2017.

Other entrants
The following players received wildcards into the singles main draw:
  Matteo Donati
  Andrea Pellegrino
  Pietro Rondoni
  Lorenzo Sonego

The following player received entry into the singles main draw as a special exempt:
  Matteo Viola

The following player received entry into the singles main draw as an alternate:
  Viktor Galović

The following players received entry from the qualifying draw:
  Andrea Arnaboldi
  Ivan Gakhov
  Gianluca Mager
  Roberto Marcora

The following players received entry as lucky losers:
  Tomislav Brkić
  Mikael Ymer

Champions

Singles

 Filip Krajinović def.  Salvatore Caruso 6–3, 6–2.

Doubles

 Attila Balázs /  Fabiano de Paula def.  Johan Brunström /  Dino Marcan 5–7, 6–4, [10–4].

External links
Official website

Thindown Challenger Biella
Tennis tournaments in Italy